The 1999–2000 FIBA Saporta Cup was the thirty-fourth edition of FIBA's 2nd-tier level European-wide professional club basketball competition. It occurred between September 21, 1999, and April 11, 2000. The final was held at Lausanne, Switzerland.

Competition system
 48 teams (national domestic cup champions, plus the best qualified teams from the most important European national domestic leagues), entered a preliminary group stage, divided into eight groups of six teams each, and played a round-robin. The final standings were based on individual wins and defeats. In the case of a tie between two or more teams, after the group stage, the following criteria were used to decide the final classification: 1) number of wins in one-to-one games between the teams; 2) basket average between the teams; 3) general basket average within the group.
 The top four teams from each group qualified for a 1/16 Final Playoff (X-pairings, home and away games), where the winners advanced further to 1/8 Finals, 1/4 Finals, and 1/2 Final.
 The Final was played at a predetermined venue.

Country ranking
For the 1999–2000 FIBA Saporta Cup, the countries are allocated places according to their place on the FIBA country rankings, which takes into account their performance in European competitions from 1996–97 to 1998–99.

Team allocation 
The labels in the parentheses show how each team qualified for the place of its starting round:

 1st, 2nd, 3rd, 4th, 5th, etc.: League position after eventual Playoffs
 CW: Cup winners
 WC: Wild card

* Tatami Rhöndorf (3rd in the previous season of Bundesliga) merged with Skyliners Frankfurt (at that time newly formed club), so Skyliners took their place in the competition.

Preliminary round

Round of 32

|}

Round of 16

|}

Quarterfinals

|}

Semifinals

|}

Final
April 11, Centre Intercommunal de Glace de Malley, Lausanne

|}

Awards

FIBA Saporta Cup Finals MVP 
 Anthony Bowie ( AEK Athens)

Notes

References

External links
  1999–00 FIBA Saporta Cup @ FIBA Europe.com
 1999–00 FIBA Saporta Cup at Linguasport

Saporta
1999-2000